Stephen Haines may refer to:

 Stephen Haines, Green candidate in the Queensland state election, 2009
 Stephen G. Haines (1945–2012), American organizational theorist and management consultant
 Mrs. Stephen Haines, a role of Norma Shearer in the 1939 film The Women

See also 

 Haines (disambiguation) 
 Haynes (disambiguation)